Makha is a village in Sardulgarh tehsil of Mansa district in Punjab, India.

Geography 

Talwandi Aklia, Chhapian Wali, Gharangna, Uddat Bhagat Ram, Maujia and Raipur are the surrounding villages.

References 

Villages in Mansa district, India
Villages surrounding Talwandi Sabo Power Plant